"Stay with Me" is a country music song written by J.P. Pennington and originally recorded by country pop band Exile in 1978. In 1979, the song was released as a single by the different artists. The first version, recorded by Dandy, reached number 57 of the Billboard Hot Country Singles chart. The song was most notably recorded by Dave and Sugar and Family Brown, who both reached the top ten of the country charts in the U.S. and Canada, respectively.

While not originally released as a single when recorded, Exile's version was later released in 1985.

Chart performance

Dandy

Dave & Sugar

Family Brown

Exile

References

1979 singles
1985 singles
Dave & Sugar songs
Exile (American band) songs
Family Brown songs
RCA Records singles
Songs written by J.P. Pennington
1978 songs